Richard Alan "Tardo" Hammer (born February 26, 1958, New York City) is an American jazz pianist.

Hammer's mother is an amateur pianist. He worked with Richie Vitale in the 1980s and also played  with Warne Marsh, Charlie Rouse, Junior Cook, Bill Hardman, Johnny Griffin, Lionel Hampton, Lou Donaldson, and Art Farmer and Clifford Jordan. A member of Bopera House starting in 1986, he shared leader duties in the group with John Marshall after 1988. He played with Vernel Fournier, George Coleman, Gary Bartz, C. Sharpe, Al Cohn, Harold Ashby, and Annie Ross in the 1990s.  Long time pianist and musical director for vocalist Annie Ross, has worked with other notable vocalists including David Allyn, Teri Thornton, Abbey Lincoln, Earl Coleman and Marilyn Moore.  Recordings include trio CDs on Sharp Nine Records and Cellar Live.  Still active as performer, sideman and teacher in New York City.

References

Living people
1958 births
American jazz pianists
American male pianists
Musicians from New York City
20th-century American pianists
Jazz musicians from New York (state)
21st-century American pianists
20th-century American male musicians
21st-century American male musicians
American male jazz musicians